Olympe Démarez, (27 January 1878 – 5 September 1964) was the first French female lawyer in the French Nord department, the first woman to get elected to the city council of Dunkirk in 1945 at a time when it was still extremely difficult for women to exercise certain professions almost entirely dominated by men. She Was in a relationship with lawyer, then mayor of Dunkirk Charles Valantin. Together they formed an unorthodox couple for that period of time; lived together without being married.

Biography 
Born in Catillon-sur-Sambre (Nord Department), Démarez had a quite modest background, coming from a below middle-class family of textile workers living in a hamlet. She obtains her first diploma from the hamlet's own primary school in August 1890. She quits school to follow her parents' path as textile workers but later, she finds out that she is able to go back to school so she takes her chances.  

In 1898 Démarez is 20 years old, it is also the year of her debut in teaching. She starts working 180 kilometers away from her birthplace, which is rather out of ordinary considering the place and time and the difficulty to travel. She starts working as a school teacher first in Petit-Fort-Philippe (Graveline's hamlet) from 1898 to 1901 and then in Dunkirk from 1902 to 1908.  

At the age of 30, she quits teaching and the security that comes with the teacher profession, following her inclination for studying law, while these studies were just opening for the female students and even though they had the right to study it wasn't easy to find other female students. To support herself and to finance her studies, she starts working as a secretary at the office of Charles Valentin, a young 27 years old lawyer, recently registered at the Dunkirk bar association.

After obtaining her associate degree in law, in 1913 she obtains her bachelor's degree from law school.  

Her relationship with Charles Valentin evolves ː he is no longer just his employer but also her lover and her companion. Despite this cohabitation lifestyle, which is not really common in their bourgeois entourage, the couple is very honorably respected in Flanders. On 20 September 1939, Charles Valentin was victim of a serious traffic accident in the Lille suburbs. Despite the care of Oscar Lambret, a prominent Lille surgeon, his condition worsened. Olympe Démarez then asked the deputy mayor of Lille Charles Saint-Venant to marry them. Her husband died shortly after the ceremony. The motivations of the two spouses are not known, but it is possible to suppose the will of Olympe Démarez to remain faithful to this man by bearing his name and the will of Charles Valentin to secure the future of the woman who gave him all during their 25 years of companionship allowing her officially as his wife, to inherit from her husband.

During WWII Démarez goes back to her hometown and takes care of the refugee children.  

After the French Liberation, Dunkirk's mayor engages her to reorganize the city's archives.  

Women acquired the right to vote in 1944, and voted for the first time in the municipal elections of April 1945 (Women's right to vote). Olympe Démarez-Valentin, widow of the former mayor, becomes the first woman to be elected to the municipal council of Dunkirk at the end of these first elections open to women, which means being able to vote and to be able to get elected.  Which was great for Démarez to get elected at the first opportunity.  

She continued to participate in public meetings ant to the events organized by her political family during ceremonies of homage to her husband on the anniversary of his death.  

Démarez died on 5 September 1964 at the age of 86.

Career 
Démarez started to work as a school teacher first in Petit-Fort-Philippe (Graveline's hamlet) from 1898 to 1901 and then in Dunkirk from 1902 to 1908.  

It was 2 February 1914, before the Douai Court of Appeal, Démarez was declared officially a lawyer, 14 years after Jeanne Chauvin first female lawyer in France.  After Démarez there wasn't any other (new) female lawyer in France until 1920. But because of the close encounter of the "great war" one does not find its trace then on any table of the bar association of the jurisdiction of the Court. It is therefore only after the end of hostilities, on 17 November 1920, that a new applicant will appear in the name of Adrienne Gobert who will enter the bar of Lille, however never exercise the profession.

Démarez had to put her law career aside to help his companion's political agenda to defend his cause but she prepares all the paper work single-handedly. She started later working at the town hall to reorganize the archives before saying goodbye to a career well-served and a lifetime of achievement.

References

1878 births
1964 deaths
20th-century French women lawyers
20th-century French lawyers
People from Nord (French department)
French city councillors
20th-century French women politicians
20th-century French politicians
Women local politicians